Eureka Shipbuilding was a wooden shipbuilding company in Eureka, California. The shipyard was just south of town in Fields Landing on the South Bay of Humboldt Bay. To support the World War 2 demand for ships Eureka Shipbuilding shipyard switched over to military construction and built: United States Marine Corps tugboatss. Eureka Shipbuilding was started in 1941. On January 25, 1943 Eureka Ship Builders, Inc. was awarded a contract to build six V2-M-AL1 tugboats at a cost of $35,970 each, contact number DA-MCc-824. V2-M-AL1 tus is a class of Type V ship.  The V2-M-AL1 is also called a Port Sewall class tug. V2-V2-M-AL1 tugs were named for American ports. All of Eureka Shipbuilding tug were used for Lend-Lease use to Britain as type TUSA tugs.
Afte the war in 1947 the company was renamed `   

V2-M-AL1 tugboats were: Wood hull, 90 tons, a beam of 19 feet, had a diesel engine with 240 horsepower, fuel Oil tanks with 1920 gallons. Other Built V2-M-AL1 were built by Puget Sound Naval Shipyard, Standard Shipbuilding, Steinbach Iron works, Arlington Shipbuilding, Texas Shipbuilding, Siletz Boatworks, Blair Company, and Marinette Marine.

Eureka Shipbuilding ships

Tugboats, V2-M-AL1  Port Sewall class:

Eureka Boat Building & Repair
Eureka Boat Building & Repair built boats:

See also
California during World War II
Maritime history of California
 Union Iron Works]
 Richmond Shipyards
Kneass Boat Works
Pacific Bridge Company
 Wooden boats of World War 2
Cryer & Sons

References

American Theater of World War II
1940s in California
Defunct shipbuilding companies of the United States